The James Alvis House at 1311 Pole Line Rd. in Twin Falls in Twin Falls County, Idaho was built in 1918.  It was listed on the National Register of Historic Places in 1980.

It is a  one-and-a-half-story bungalow-style house built of lava rock and light yellow brick.  It is a fine example of Bungalow architecture, with the local variation of use of lava rock.  It was built by stonemason Jeremiah H. Bryant. The house was demolished in 1994 to make way for the Magic Valley Mall

References

Houses on the National Register of Historic Places in Idaho
Houses completed in 1918
Twin Falls County, Idaho
Bungalow architecture in Idaho